Namibicola splendida is a species of snout moth in the genus Namibicola. It was described by Boris Balinsky in 1991 and is known from Namibia (including Luederitz, the type location) and South Africa.

References

Moths described in 1991
Phycitinae